This is a list of current and former Victoria's Secret Angels and fashion models who have walked in the Victoria's Secret Fashion Show since its inception in 1995.

Victoria's Secret Angels
Models who were chosen as Victoria's Secret Angels are listed in the table below. In June 2021, Victoria's Secret announced that it was ending its Angels brand.

PINK spokesmodels
The following is the list of models who have been contracted as spokesmodels for Victoria's Secret's PINK brand.

Notes

References

External links
 The Models of Victoria's Secret: A Who2 Loop
 VS All Access (bios, interviews, events, media)

Lists of female models
Lists of models
Victoria's Secret
Victoria's Secret